Tom Crosby Jr. (December 4, 1928 – March 24, 2011) was an American politician. He was a member of the Georgia House of Representatives from 1977 to 1989. He was a member of the Democratic party.

References

2011 deaths
Democratic Party members of the Georgia House of Representatives
1928 births
People from Waycross, Georgia